Ghasera Fort is a ruined fort in Ghasera village in Nuh district of Haryana state in northern India, which has been notified as a protected monument by the state government. Currently, the majority of the residents of the village are Muslim Meos, though Hindus also live there.

History

The ruined Ghasera Fort lies at Ghasera village  from Nuh city on Nun-Sohna highway. In the 18th century, Ghasera was ruled by Bargurjar Rajputs whose territory included the parganas of Ghasera, Indor, Kotla, and Sohna. To their north was the Princely State of Nawabs of Farrukhnagar which was founded in 1732. To their west was the jagir of the Raos of Rewari, ancestors of Rao Tula Ram. They possessed forts at Gokulgarh and Gurawra (or, Guraora). In the south were the Jat rulers of Bharatpur State, and Kachwaha Rajput rulers of Alwar State. The Mughals, who were protected by Marathas, had seen their territory shrink to a nominal area from Delhi to Palam. 

During the Battle of Ghasera, Surajmal captured Ghasera fort, killing the Rajput Raja, Bahadur Singh Bargujar, and his son, Ajit Singh of Kol (Chakala Koil, or present day Aligarh, on the outskirts of Palwal) with help of Mughal Wazir Safardgunj.

The Jats and Pathans  laid siege to Ghasera during the 1753 Battle of Ghasera, which lasted for 3 months. Led by  Mir Muhammad Panah and Bhawani Singh  the Raos of Rewari - who were traditional enemies of the Bargurjar of Ghasera - fought on the side of the Jats. During the siege, 1,500 Jats and Pathans  were killed by gunfire from the ramparts of Ghasera fort. On the opposing side, from an army of 8,000, after 3 months Rao Bahadur Singh had just 25 soldiers left. On 23 April 1753, a desperate Bahadur Singh Bargurjar slayed all his women, opened the gates of the fort for the final battle to the death, during which he and his companions were killed. 

The Marathas and Mughals laid siege to the Jat fort of Kumher. In January 1754, Fateh Singh Bargujar, the surviving son of Bahadur Singh Bargujar, recovered Ghasera as a result of the Mughal siege,  with the assistance of the Mughal vizier, Imad-ul-Mulk. However, a contingent led by Suraj Mal's son, Jawahar Singh, ousted Fateh Singh from Ghasera. The Maratha siege of the Jats ended in a peace treaty in 1754, between the Jats and the Peshwa of the Maratha Empire, Malhar Rao Holkar. The peace process was facilitated by the Maratha ruler of Gwalior State, Mahadaji Scindia and the brother of Malhar Rao Holkar, Raghunathrao Bhat.

Architecture
Ruined walls and a grand entrance in stone and lakhori bricks built with surkhi (crushed baked red bricked)-lime mortar show that Ghasera was a historical village. Of the four entrances, only one remains.

See also 
 List of Monuments of National Importance in Haryana
 State Protected Monuments in Haryana
 List of Indus Valley Civilization sites in Haryana, Punjab, Rajasthan, Gujarat, India & Pakistan
 National Parks & Wildlife Sanctuaries of Haryana
 List of Indian states and territories by highest point 
 Tourism in Haryana
 Haryana Tourism

Notes

References

External links 
 History of Bharatput Jat kings

Forts in Haryana
Archaeological sites in Haryana
Tourist attractions in Haryana
Religious buildings and structures converted into mosques